Jane Reavill Ransom is a prize-winning American popular science writer, novelist and poet.

Biography
Ransom received her B.A. in journalism from Indiana University. She holds a Master of Arts in English with a concentration in creative writing, as well as a Master of Arts in Comparative Literature, from New York University.

From 1984 to 1989, she was a New York Daily News national/international editor. She was also an editor for the San Juan Star. In 1990 she held a NYU fellowship in comparative literature, 1988–90. From 1997 to 2002, she was professor of creative writing at Rutgers and New York University. In 2004, she was distinguished poet in residence at Saint Mary's College of California.

She currently lives in Durham, North Carolina. She is the granddaughter of poet and critic John Crowe Ransom.

Bibliography
Non-Fiction
 Self-Intelligence: The New Science-Based Approach for Reaching Your True Potential

Fiction
 Bye-Bye

Poetry
 Without Asking (Story Line Press, 1989)
 Scene of the Crime (Story Line Press, 1997)

Prizes and awards
 Nicholas Roerich Poetry Prize for Without Asking
 New York University Press Prize 1996 for Fiction for Bye-Bye
 Mamdouha S. Bobst Award for Bye-Bye
 Poetry fellowships at the New York Foundation for the Arts and the Massachusetts Council for the Arts
 Residences at Yaddo and MacDowell

References
 2006 Interview

20th-century American novelists
American women novelists
Living people
Indiana University alumni
New York University alumni
American women poets
20th-century American women writers
20th-century American poets
Year of birth missing (living people)
21st-century American women